Grantown-on-Spey (East) railway station served the town of Grantown-on-Spey, in Scotland. It was one of two railway stations serving the town, the other being Grantown-on-Spey (West).

It was situated to the south-east of the town, on the opposite side of the River Spey.

Restoration
In 2015 Revack Lodge Estate announced plans to develop the station site as a heritage centre. This will involve renovating the old station buildings into a craft shop, and converting an old railway carriage into a cafe. It will also feature a Highland games demonstration area.

Los Angeles artist and gallerist Jan Corey Helford projected the renovations. In 2018 the renovations to the former Grantown East station were complete. The station reopened exactly fifty years after the last train passed through as the Highland Heritage & Cultural Centre.

References

External links
Grantown East: Highland Heritage & Cultural Centre

Disused railway stations in Highland (council area)
Railway stations in Great Britain opened in 1863
Railway stations in Great Britain closed in 1965
Beeching closures in Scotland
Former Great North of Scotland Railway stations